Adaptive compression is a type of data compression which changes compression algorithms based on the type of data being compressed.

References

Data compression